Deepak Chandrakant Prabhu Pauskar is an Indian politician. He was elected to the Goa Legislative Assembly from Sanvordem in the 2017 Goa Legislative Assembly election as a member of the Maharashtrawadi Gomantak Party. He was named  Minister of Public Works and Museum in Pramod Sawant cabinet. Ajgaonkar and Pauskar joined the Bharatiya Janata Party in March 2019 thus minimizing Maharashtrawadi Gomantak Party to one seat in the Goa Legislative Assembly.

References

1973 births
Living people
Maharashtrawadi Gomantak Party politicians
People from South Goa district
Goa MLAs 2017–2022
Bharatiya Janata Party politicians from Goa